The 1995 Murcian regional election was held on Sunday, 28 May 1995, to elect the 4th Regional Assembly of the autonomous community of the Region of Murcia. All 45 seats in the Regional Assembly were up for election. The election was held simultaneously with regional elections in twelve other autonomous communities and local elections all throughout Spain.

Former president Carlos Collado had been forced to resign in April 1993 by his own party, the Spanish Socialist Workers' Party (PSOE), as a result of the ongoing struggle between the two main party factions (the guerristas and the renovadores) and a political scandal over the purchase of the Casa Grande estate. He was replaced by María Antonia Martínez, the first woman presiding over a Spanish autonomous community as well as the only one to date holding the office in the Region of Murcia. The crisis resulting in Collado's resignation was among the factors said to contribute to the opposition People's Party (PP) spectacular gains in that year's June general election, overcoming the PSOE as the most voted party in the region for the first time in democracy; a feat which was confirmed in the 1994 European Parliament election.

The regional election resulted in the PP consolidating its gains, winning by a landslide as the vote for the ruling PSOE plummeted. PP leader Ramón Luis Valcárcel would become the new President of the Region of Murcia, with the PP remaining in government ever since. The PP would also remain the prime party of Murcian politics until 2019.

Overview

Electoral system
The Regional Assembly of Murcia was the devolved, unicameral legislature of the autonomous community of Murcia, having legislative power in regional matters as defined by the Spanish Constitution and the Murcian Statute of Autonomy, as well as the ability to vote confidence in or withdraw it from a regional president.

Voting for the Regional Assembly was on the basis of universal suffrage, which comprised all nationals over 18 years of age, registered in the Region of Murcia and in full enjoyment of their political rights. The 45 members of the Regional Assembly of Murcia were elected using the D'Hondt method and a closed list proportional representation, with an electoral threshold of five percent of valid votes—which included blank ballots—being applied regionally. Seats were allocated to constituencies, which were established by law as follows:

District One 
District Two 
District Three 
District Four 
District Five 

Each constituency was entitled to an initial minimum of one seat, with the remaining 40 allocated among the constituencies in proportion to their populations.

Election date
The term of the Regional Assembly of Murcia expired four years after the date of its previous election. Elections to the Regional Assembly were fixed for the fourth Sunday of May every four years. The previous election was held on 26 May 1991, setting the election date for the Regional Assembly on Sunday, 28 May 1995.

The Regional Assembly of Murcia could not be dissolved before the date of expiry of parliament except in the event of an investiture process failing to elect a regional president within a two-month period from the first ballot. In such a case, the Regional Assembly was to be automatically dissolved and a snap election called, with elected deputies merely serving out what remained of their four-year terms.

Parties and candidates
The electoral law allowed for parties and federations registered in the interior ministry, coalitions and groupings of electors to present lists of candidates. Parties and federations intending to form a coalition ahead of an election were required to inform the relevant Electoral Commission within ten days of the election call, whereas groupings of electors needed to secure the signature of at least one percent of the electorate in the Region of Murcia, disallowing electors from signing for more than one list of candidates.

Below is a list of the main parties and electoral alliances which contested the election:

Opinion polls
The table below lists voting intention estimates in reverse chronological order, showing the most recent first and using the dates when the survey fieldwork was done, as opposed to the date of publication. Where the fieldwork dates are unknown, the date of publication is given instead. The highest percentage figure in each polling survey is displayed with its background shaded in the leading party's colour. If a tie ensues, this is applied to the figures with the highest percentages. The "Lead" column on the right shows the percentage-point difference between the parties with the highest percentages in a poll. When available, seat projections determined by the polling organisations are displayed below (or in place of) the percentages in a smaller font; 23 seats were required for an absolute majority in the Regional Assembly of Murcia.

Results

Overall

Distribution by constituency

Aftermath

Notes

References
Opinion poll sources

Other

1995 in Murcia (region)
Murcia
Regional elections in the Region of Murcia
May 1995 events in Europe